Giovanna Chiriu is an Italian paracanoeist who has competed since the late 2000s. She won a bronze medal in the K-1 200 m LTA event at the 2010 ICF Canoe Sprint World Championships in Poznań.

References
2010 ICF Canoe Sprint World Championships women's K-1 200 m LTA results. - accessed 20 August 2010.

Italian female canoeists
Living people
Year of birth missing (living people)
ICF Canoe Sprint World Championships medalists in paracanoe
LTA classification paracanoeists
Paracanoeists of Italy